The Battle of Camp Davies was a skirmish during the American Civil War on November 22, 1863, near a Union Army camp about six miles south of Corinth, Mississippi. A 70-man detachment of the 1st Regiment Alabama Cavalry (Union), commanded by Major Francis L. Cramer, drove off a 150-man Confederate force of the 16th Battalion, Mississippi Cavalry State Troops (sometimes referred to as 1st Battalion or simply as Ham's Battalion of Cavalry), commanded by Major Thomas W. Ham, and killed at least 4 Confederate soldiers, while suffering two severely wounded troopers. This action is the only engagement recorded as occurring at or near Camp Davies in major sources on American Civil War battles. Other similar engagements in the vicinity of Corinth in 1863 may have occurred near Camp Davies.

Background 

On May 30, 1862, Confederate General Pierre G. T. Beauregard abandoned the railroad center of Corinth, Mississippi to Union Army forces commanded by Major General Henry W. Halleck at the conclusion of the Siege of Corinth. Halleck began building defenses around Corinth. In order to defend the town and observe movement of Confederate troops and guerillas, and to secure fresh water supplies for the soldiers, the Union Army built camps around Corinth in strategic locations.

In November, 1862, the 14th Missouri Volunteer Infantry Regiment, established a base six miles south of Corinth, along the lower reaches of Clear Creek, near its junction with the Tuscumbia River. They named it Camp Davies, in honor of their former division commander, Brigadier General Thomas Alfred Davies. Eventually enclosed by a wooden stockade, it contained forty buildings within the walls.

Battle

Corinth area military engagements in 1863 

From November 1862 to January 1864, Historian E. B. Long recorded skirmishes in the Corinth area on June 11, 1863, August 16, 1863, November 2, 1863, November 12, 1863 and December 23, 1863. Long cites Frederick Dyer's A Compendium of the War of Rebellion (1908) as one of the sources in preparing his work, The Civil War Day by Day (1971).

The November 22, 1863 engagement in the Corinth area was recorded by Frederick Dyer in 1908 and E. B. Long in 1971 as a skirmish at Camp Davies.

Skirmish at Camp Davies 

A brief report on the Skirmish at Camp Davies, Mississippi on November 22, 1863 by Union Army Brigadier General John D. Stevenson is shown at page 573 of Series 1, volume 31, Part 1 of The War of the Rebellion: a Compilation of the Official Records of the Union and Confederate Armies. General Stevenson reported from Corinth, Mississippi, November 22, 1863 on the skirmish of a detachment of the 1st Regiment Alabama Cavalry (Union) with a Confederate force as follows:

A force of enemy, 150 strong, under Ham, appearing on Ripley road, 5 miles from Camp Davies, were attacked by Major Cramer, First Alabama Cavalry, with 70 men, and after a sharp fight were driven in confusion in direction of Rienzi. Enemy's loss, 4 known to be killed. Our loss, 2 severely wounded.

Aftermath 

Following the skirmishes of 1863 various regiments used Camp Davies, until abandoned and destroyed on January 24, 1864. The garrisons had to be watchful for Confederate raiders, scouts and guerrillas who appeared in the area intermittently.

The Confederate officer "Ham" referred to in the report would have been Major Thomas Wiley Ham, then major commanding 16th Battalion, Mississippi Cavalry State Troops (sometimes referred to as 1st Battalion or simply as Ham's Battalion of Cavalry). The battalion was transferred to Confederate service on May 4, 1864 and consolidated with other companies to form Ham's Cavalry Regiment with Thomas W. Ham as colonel. The regiment is shown in the Mississippi State record of commissions as the Seventh Regiment Cavalry but surviving Confederate organization records do not show it with that title Colonel Ham was mortally wounded in fighting at the Battle of Ezra Church, west of Atlanta on July 28, 1864 and died on July 30, 1864. 

Major Francis L. Cramer of the 1st Regiment Alabama Cavalry (Union) was first lieutenant and adjutant of the 1st Regiment Nebraska Volunteer Cavalry when he was discharged for promotion to major in the 1st Alabama Cavalry Regiment (Union) on October 24, 1863. The 1st Regiment Nebraska Volunteer Infantry had been re-designated 1st Regiment Nebraska Volunteer Cavalry on October 11, 1863. Cramer was wounded and captured during the Carolinas campaign at the Battle of Monroe's Crossroads on May 10, 1865. After the battle Cramer was paroled due to his wounds. On April 3, 1867, President Andrew Johnson nominated Cramer for appointment to the grade of brevet brigadier general, to rank from March 13, 1865 and the United States Senate confirmed the appointment on April 8, 1867.

Notes

References

Sources
 Camp Davies, National Park Service. Retrieved March 27, 2020.
 Mississippi: Ham's Cavalry Regiment, The American Civil War web site. Retrieved March 29, 2020.
 Allardice, Bruce S. Confederate Colonels: A Biographical Register. Columbia: University of Missouri Press, 2008. .
 Ballard, Michael B. The Civil War in Mississippi: Major Campaigns and Battles. Jackson, Mississippi: University of Mississippi Press, 2011. .
 Dyer, Frederick H. A Compendium of the War of Rebellion: Compiled and Arranged From Official Records of the Federal and Confederate Armies, Reports of the Adjutant Generals of the Several States, The Army Registers and Other Reliable Documents and Sources. Dayton, Ohio: Morningside Books, 1978. . First published 1908 by Dyer Publishing.
 Eicher, John H., and David J. Eicher, Civil War High Commands. Stanford: Stanford University Press, 2001. .
 Long, E. B. The Civil War Day by Day: An Almanac, 1861–1865. Garden City, New York: Doubleday, 1971. .
 United States War Department. The War of the Rebellion: A Compilation of the Official Records of the Union and Confederate Armies. Washington, D.C.: U.S. Government Printing Office, 1880–1901. . Series 1, volume 31, Part 1 (1890).
 United States War Department. The War of the Rebellion: A Compilation of the Official Records of the Union and Confederate Armies. Washington, D.C.: U.S. Government Printing Office, 1880–1901. . Series 1, vol. XLVII (47), Part 1. (1895) Report of Major Sanford Tramel, First Alabama Cavalry of operations January 28-March 24. March 28, 1865. 

Conflicts in 1863
1863 in Mississippi
Battles of the Western Theater of the American Civil War
Union victories of the American Civil War
Battles of the American Civil War in Mississippi
Alcorn County, Mississippi
November 1863 events